Iffeldorf is a municipality in the Weilheim-Schongau district of Bavaria, Germany.

Transport
The municipality has a railway station, on the Kochelsee Railway.

References

Weilheim-Schongau